Franz Sarnitz (14 April 1919 – 8 December 1992) was an Austrian sports shooter. He competed in the trap event at the 1960 Summer Olympics.

References

1919 births
1992 deaths
Austrian male sport shooters
Olympic shooters of Austria
Shooters at the 1960 Summer Olympics
Sportspeople from Vienna
20th-century Austrian people